Red Giant Movies is an Indian film production and distribution company headed by actor, politician and businessman Udhayanidhi Stalin.

History 
The proposed venture of the studio was meant to be a collaboration between director Thamizhvaanan and actor Vishal, but the film never took off. Subsequently, the first production of Red Giant Movies was the action comedy Kuruvi (2008) starring Vijay, following which the studio financed K. S. Ravikumar's Aadhavan (2009) starring Suriya. The studio later worked on big budget films including the Kamal Haasan-starrer Manmadan Ambu (2010) and AR Murugadoss's 7aum Arivu (2011).

The studio received acclaim in 2010, when all four of its distribution projects, Vinnaithaandi Varuvaayaa, Madrasapattinam, Boss Engira Bhaskaran and Mynaa became commercial successes. In the case of Mynaa, the studio received praise for backing and choosing to purchase a small budget film and helping market it as a bigger film. From the end of 2011, Red Giant Movies has concentrated solely on producing films starring Udhayanidhi Stalin. The production house revived its widespread operations in production and distribution of films after 2021. Red Giant Movies is currently established as the leading production house in the Tamil film industry with numerous blockbusters released under their banner including Vikram (2022). Red Giant Movies recently joined hands with Kamal Haasan's Raj Kamal Films International (RKFI) for the star's greatly anticipated film to be directed by maverick filmmaker Mani Ratnam.

Filmography

Films produced

Films distributed
In addition to the films produced by Red Giant Movies since 2008, the following films from other banners were distributed by the company:

Films Distributed

References

External links 
Official website

Film distributors of India
Film production companies based in Chennai
2008 establishments in Tamil Nadu
Indian companies established in 2008
Mass media companies established in 2008